The Pfalz D.VIII was a German World War I fighter aircraft.

Development
The D.VIII was approved for production arising from German initiatives in 1918 to develop superior fighter aircraft. Armament was twin 7.92mm Spandau machine guns.

Production
Forty units were completed but as this was very near the end of the war, they were used mostly for evaluation purposes.

Specifications (D.VIII - (Sh III engine))

See also

References

Further reading

External links

 YouTube May 2020 video of Mikael Carlson's authentic Pfalz D VIII biplane reproduction in ground-trials, with restored and operable Sh III engine
Pfalz D.VIII

1910s German fighter aircraft
Military aircraft of World War I
D.VIII
Biplanes
Rotary-engined aircraft
Aircraft first flown in 1918